The 2012 Caribbean Cup is an international football tournament that was held in Antigua and Barbuda from 7–16 December.

Group A

Antigua and Barbuda

Head coach:  Rolston Williams

|-----
! colspan="9" bgcolor="#B0D3FB" align="left" |
|----- bgcolor="#DFEDFD"

 

|-----
! colspan="9" bgcolor="#B0D3FB" align="left" |
|----- bgcolor="#DFEDFD"

|-----
! colspan="9" bgcolor="#B0D3FB" align="left" |
|----- bgcolor="#DFEDFD"

|}

Dominican Republic
Head coach:  Clemente Hernández

Martinique

Head coach:  Patrick Cavelan

Trinidad and Tobago

Head coach:  Hutson Charles

Group B

Cuba

Head coach:  Chandler González

French Guiana

Head coach:  François Louis-Marie

Haiti

Head coach:  Israel Blake Cantero

Jamaica

Head coach:  Theodore Whitmore

References

Squads
Caribbean Cup squads